Zurich is an unincorporated community in Blaine County, Montana, United States, located at .  Located along the Hi-Line of Montana, between Harlem and Chinook, along U.S. Route 2. It has a post office with the ZIP code of 59547, and a public school serving grades PK through 8.  There is also a bar; the store and bank are closed and abandoned, as are two grain elevators and other business buildings.  Various online sources give the population as 22-23 residents. 

The Milk River flows south of town.

Demographics

History
Sometime around 1887, Great Northern Railway officials named one of their main line sidings Zurich, for the city in Switzerland. A post office was established in 1907. In 1913 the townsite was platted.  In 1923, a population increase was occasioned by the arrival of Volga Germans seeking employment in sugar beet farming.

Climate
According to the Köppen Climate Classification system, Zurich has a semi-arid climate, abbreviated "BSk" on climate maps.

Education
Zurich educates students from kindergarten through 8th grade.

Notable person
Zurich is the birthplace of Mike Tilleman.

References 

Unincorporated communities in Blaine County, Montana
Unincorporated communities in Montana
Swiss-American history